The Latin Grammy Award for Best Urban Song is an honor presented annually at the Latin Grammy Awards, a ceremony that recognizes excellence and promotes a wider awareness of cultural diversity and contributions of Latin recording artists in the United States and internationally. According to the category description guide for the 13th Latin Grammy Awards, the award is for new songs that contain at least 51% of the lyrics in Spanish or Portuguese. The accolade is awarded to the songwriter(s) of said song. Instrumental recordings and cover songs are not eligible for the category.

The award was first presented to Puerto Rican musicians Eduardo Cabra and René Pérez of the duo Calle 13 in 2007. The award has been presented three times to Puerto Rican songwriters and once to a Panamian, Spaniard and Argentine songwriter in 2008, 2010, and 2011 respectively. The only songwriter to receive this award in more than one occasion is René Pérez. In 2010, Spanish rapper La Mala Rodríguez became the first female artist to win in this field. Daddy Yankee holds the record of most nominations in general and most nominations without a win with eight. Also, he is the only artist who has been nominated every year since the category's inception (except in 2014). In 2014, "Bailando" by Enrique Iglesias featuring Descemer Bueno & Gente De Zona became the first urban song to win this award and Song of the Year.

Recipients

2000s

2010s

2020s

All-time table

See also

Billboard Latin Music Award for Latin Rhythm Airplay Song of the Year
Lo Nuestro Award for Urban Song of the Year

References

External links 
Official website of the Latin Grammy Awards

 
Song awards
Awards established in 2007
Urban Song
Songwriting awards